Vieux Manoir (1947–1981)  was a French Thoroughbred racehorse and Champion sire.

Background
Bred by Baron Edouard A. de Rothschild and raced by his son Guy following his death in 1949. Members of the prominent Rothschild banking family of France, they owned Haras de Meautry breeding farm in Touques, Calvados where Vieux Manoir was foaled. Vieux Manoir was trained by Frenchman, Geoffroy Watson, a member of the renowned English Racing Colony in Chantilly.

Racing career
Vieux Manoir most notably won the 1950 French Classic, the Grand Prix de Paris, and was second in the British Classic, the St. Leger Stakes.

Stud record
Retired to stud, Vieux Manoir was the leading sire in France in 1958. His best-known progeny was Val de Loir, whose wins included the Classic Prix du Jockey Club in 1962 and who became a three-time leading sire in France as well as a Leading broodmare sire in Great Britain & Ireland. Another son, Le Haar, sired Exbury and Niksar and was the leading sire in France in 1963. Through Vieux Manoir's daughter, Agujita, he is the damsire of the international superstar filly and U.S. Racing Hall of Fame inductee, All Along. And, through another daughter, Astuce, he is the damsire of the 1976 Prix de l'Arc de Triomphe winner, Ivanjica.

Vieux Manoir died at age thirty-four in 1981.

References
 Vieux Manoir profile at Gatewood Farms

1947 racehorse births
1981 racehorse deaths
Racehorses bred in Calvados (department)
Racehorses trained in France
French Thoroughbred Classic Race winners
Thoroughbred family 10-e
Racehorses bred in France
Chefs-de-Race